A theater district (also spelled theatre district) is a common name for a neighborhood containing several of a city's theatres.

Places
Theater District, Manhattan, New York City
Boston Theater District
Buffalo Theater District
Cleveland Theater District
Houston Theater District
Broadway Theater District (Los Angeles)
Theater District (San Francisco, California)
Yiddish Theater District, New York City
Theater District (Tacoma, Washington)

Railway stations
Theater District station, Houston, Texas
South 9th Street/Theater District station, Tacoma, Washington

Other uses